The Standing Committee on Foreign Affairs and International Development (FAAE) is a committee in the House of Commons of Canada that focuses on Canada's foreign policy and international development.

Before the 39th Parliament, the committee was known as the Standing Committee on Foreign Affairs and International Trade.

Mandate
 Canadian foreign and development policy
 International affairs (including developments or crises in specific regions or countries) and international security;
 Membership of international organizations such as the United Nations, the World Bank, the International Monetary Fund, the Organization of American States, Asia-Pacific Economic Co-operation, the G8, the North Atlantic Treaty Organization, the Commonwealth of Nations, the Francophonie, and the Organisation for Economic Co-operation and Development.
The operation, management and legislation of the Department of Foreign Affairs and International Trade and its agencies:
 The Canadian International Development Agency
The International Development Research Centre
The International Joint Commission
The Foreign Claims Commission
The International Boundary Commission
The Roosevelt Campobello International Park Commission
The Canada-United States Permanent Joint Board on Defence
The Canadian International Grains Institute
The International Centre for Human Rights and Democratic Development

Membership

Subcommittees
Subcommittee on Agendas and Procedures (SFAA)
Subcommittee on International Human Rights (SDIR)

References
Standing Committee on Foreign Affairs and International Development (FAAE)

Foreign relations of Canada
International development organizations
Foreign
Standing_Committee_on_Foreign_Affairs_and_International_Development